The Adventures of Ociee Nash is a 2003 American adventure drama film directed by Kristen McGary and starring Keith Carradine, Mare Winningham and Skyler Day.

Plot

Cast
 Keith Carradine as Papa George Nash
 Mare Winningham as Aunt Mamie Nash
 Skyler Day as Ociee Nash
 Ty Pennington as Wilbur Wright
 Tom Key as Mr. Lynch
 Janice Akers as Frances Murphy
 Bill Butler as Ben Nash
 Jasmine Sky as Elizabeth Murphy
 Anthony P. Rodriguez as Gypsy John Leon
 John Lawhorn as Conductor John Charles
 Lucas Till as Harry Vanderbilt
 Charles Nuckols IV as Fred Nash
 Donna Wright as Nellie Bly
 Sean Daniels as Orville Wright
 Daniel Burnley	as President William McKinley

Reception
Joly Herman of Common Sense Media awarded the film four stars out of five.

References

External links
 
 
 
 The Adventures of Ociee Nash Full Movie on Youtube

2003 directorial debut films
2003 independent films
2000s American films
2000s English-language films
American adventure drama films
American independent films
Films based on American novels